The Chartered Banker Institute was established in 1875 and is the oldest professional banking institute in the world and the only remaining banking institute in the UK. It aims to help rebuild public confidence in banks and bankers by developing and embedding high ethical, professional and technical standards. The institute offers a range of qualifications for banking and financial services.

History
The organisation was formed in 1875 as the Institute of Bankers in Scotland. In 1976, a first royal charter was awarded and it became the Chartered Institute of Bankers in Scotland.

In 2011, the Institute led the establishment of the Chartered Banker Professional Standards Board (CB:PSB) an initiative supported by eight UK banks and covering 350,000 individuals working in the banking sector. The CB:PSB develops and supports the implementation of industry-wide professional standards which set out the knowledge, skills, attitudes and behaviours expected of all UK bankers.

Based at Drumsheugh House in Edinburgh, the institute has more than 30,000 members in 59 countries.  there were around one thousand fellows, who may use the post-nominals FCBI.

Qualifications
The Chartered Banker Institute provides a wide range of qualifications for banking and financial services. It is responsible for awarding Chartered Banker designation to qualified bankers, a protected title. As a professional body it is authorised by the UK Privy Council to award this designation.

Chartered Banker
Chartered Banker is the professional qualification awarded to qualified members of the Chartered Banker Institute. To become a Chartered Banker, individuals must pass a series of rigorous examinations on subjects including ethics, credit and lending, risk management and management and leadership. Chartered Bankers are required to complete a minimum of 35 hours of continuing professional development (CPD) per year, including 5 hours of ethics training, and subscribe to the Chartered Banker Code of Professional Conduct.

Chartered Banker MBA
The Chartered Banker MBA, with Bangor University, is the only qualification in the world combining an MBA and Chartered Banker status. When undertaking the Chartered Banker MBA, students study eight Compulsory Modules and four Electives to gain the 180 credits needed for the full degree and dual award of ‘Chartered Banker MBA’.

See also
The London Institute of Banking & Finance
Chartered Institute for Securities & Investment
Worshipful Company of International Bankers
List of banks in the United Kingdom
FINSIA

References

External links
 

1875 establishments in Scotland
Banking institutes
Banking in Scotland
Book publishing companies of Scotland
Organizations established in 1875
Professional associations based in Scotland
Organisations based in Edinburgh